Nièvre is a department in the Bourgogne-Franche-Comté region, central-east France. Named after the river Nièvre, it had a population of 204,452 in 2019. Its prefecture is Nevers.

Covering an area 6,817 square kilometres (2,632 sq mi), Nièvre is landlocked between six other departments: Yonne to the north, Côte-d'Or to the east, Saône-et-Loire to the southeast, Allier to the south, Cher to the west and Loiret to the northeast.

History
Nièvre is one of the original 83 departments created during the French Revolution on 4 March 1790. It was created from the former province of Nivernais.

Geography
Nièvre is part of the current region of Bourgogne-Franche-Comté, although historically it was not part of the province of Burgundy.

The department is crossed by the river Loire, the longest river in France. Industry developed around cast iron foundries using the ample supply of wood then available. Coal mining also developed during the Middle Ages around Decize and continued until the last mine closed in 1974. Forestry is now an important provider of employment. Tourists are attracted by the numerous historic sites. The Canal du Nivernais waterway is popular with houseboating enthusiasts.

Demographics
Nièvre is a rural department with about 31 inhabitants per km². Only one city (Nevers) has more than 10,000 inhabitants. It indicates the characteristic of the department, which is predominantly rural. The department is slowly losing its population since the 1970s, at the rate of 900 people a year. Abandoned houses can be seen in villages and the price of peripheral real estate is one of the lowest in France.

Population development since 1801:

Principal towns
The most populous commune is Nevers, the prefecture. As of 2019, there are 6 communes with more than 4,000 inhabitants:

Wines 
Nièvre is also well known for its white wine, Pouilly Fumé. The vineyards are scattered around villages including Pouilly-Sur-Loire, which lends its name to the appellation, Tracy sur Loire, Boisgibault, Saint Andelain. The word fumé is French for "smoky", and it is said the name comes from the smoky or flinty quality of these wines. The only grape allowed in the Pouilly-Fumé AC is Sauvignon blanc, which produces wines that are generally crisp, tart, and somewhat grassy.

Politics 
The President of the Departmental Council is Socialist Fabien Bazin, elected in July 2021. The Departmental Council of Nièvre has 34 seats. The left-wing coalition led by the Socialist Party has 20 seats.

Nièvre is traditionally a left-wing department. The results of the second round of voting in presidential elections reflect this consistently:
 In the 2007 presidential election, Ségolène Royal received 52.91% of the department's votes, as against a national per centage of just 46.94%.
 In the 1995 presidential election, Lionel Jospin received 57.07% of the department's votes, as against a national per centage of just 47.36%.
 In the 1981 presidential election, François Mitterrand received 62.91% of the department's votes, as against a national per centage of 51.76%.

Nièvre's best-known political representative was François Mitterrand who served as a senator and a deputy for the department, as well as mayor of Château-Chinon for 22 years before his election to the presidency of France in 1981.

Representation in Parliament

National Assembly
In the 2017 legislative election, Nièvre elected the following representatives to the National Assembly:

Senate
In the 2017 Senate election, Nièvre elected Patrice Joly (Socialist Party) and Nadia Sollogoub (miscellaneous right) to the Senate.

Tourism

Sport
The Circuit de Nevers Magny-Cours hosted the Formula One French Grand Prix from 1991 to 2008, the Bol d'Or from 2000 to 2014, and the French round of the Superbike World Championship since 2003. USO Nevers is a professional rugby team that plays in Rugby Pro D2.

See also
Cantons of the Nièvre department
Communes of the Nièvre department
Arrondissements of the Nièvre department
Parc naturel régional du Morvan

References

External links

 Prefecture website
 Departmental council website

  
 Official website of the Departmental Touristic Agency of Nièvre in Burgundy

 
1790 establishments in France
Departments of Bourgogne-Franche-Comté
States and territories established in 1790